Navit is a free and open-source, modular, touch screen friendly, car navigation system with GPS tracking, realtime routing engine and support for various vector map formats. It features both a 2D and 3D view of map data.

Navit supports a variety of operating systems and hardware platforms including Windows, Windows CE, Linux, macOS, Android, iPhone, and Palm webOS. The Win CE version can run on a GPS device like tomtom or cartrek.

Navit can be used with several sources of map data, notably OpenStreetMap and Garmin maps.

See also

 GPS navigation software

References

External links

 
 
 
 

Free transport software
Global Positioning System
Free mobile software
Route planning software
Free and open-source Android software